Pyeongtaek University (평택대학교, 平澤大學校) is a private research university located in Pyeongtaek, South Korea.  Originating at Pierson Memorial Union Bible Institute in 1912, Pyeongtaek University is today one of the oldest universities in South Korea.

History

Pierson Memorial Union Bible Institute was established according to the will of Dr. Arthur Tappan Pierson October 15, 1911.
On December 29, 1980 Dr. Ki-Hung Cho applied and received juridical authorization to establish Pierson Memorial Institute Foundation and Pierson Bible Seminary raised to the status of a four-year formal school. On March 1, 1984 the school changed its name to Pierson College, and on March 1, 1996 Pierson University changed its name to Pyeongtaek University and Dr. Ki-Hung Cho inaugurated as the first president of Pyeongtaek University. In 2023 the President is LEE, Dong-Hyun.

Pictures

Footnotes

External links
Pyeongtaek University Korean Website
Pyeongtaek University English Website

Christian universities and colleges
Universities and colleges in Gyeonggi Province
Gyeonggi Province